The Unki mine is an underground mine located in the central part of Zimbabwe in Shurugwi, Midlands Province. Unki represents one of the largest platinum reserves in Zimbabwe having estimated reserves of 34 million oz of platinum. The mine produces around 64,000 oz of platinum/year.

References 

Platinum mines in Zimbabwe